The Best of Me may refer to:

Music

Albums
The Best of Me (Bryan Adams album), 1999
The Best of Me (Rick Astley album), 2019
The Best of Me (Yolanda Adams album), 2007
The Best of Me, a 1998 album by Andrea Martin
The Best of Me: Saben Quién Soy, a 2018 greatest hits album by Kafu Banton
Best of Me, a 1991 compilation album by Maxi Priest
Best of Me, a 2010 compilation album by Daniel Powter

Songs
"The Best of Me" (David Foster song), originally the title-track of David Foster's 1983 album; also: 
Kenny Rogers, from The Heart of the Matter, 1985
David Foster and Olivia Newton-John, single from David Foster, 1986
Cliff Richard, from Stronger, 1989
Barry Manilow, from The Complete Collection and Then Some..., 1992
Michael Bublé, from Crazy Love (Hollywood edition bonus disc), 2010
"The Best of Me" (Bryan Adams song), 1999
"The Best of Me" (Mýa song), 2000
"The Best of Me" (The Starting Line song), 2002
"The Best of Me" (Chrisette Michele song), 2007
"Best of Me" (Sum 41 song), 2007
"Best of Me" (Daniel Powter song), 2008
"Best of Me", the theme song for Daisy of Love, 2009
"Best of Me" (Ratt song), 2010
"Best of Me", a song by Christina Aguilera from Lotus, 2012
"Best of Me", a song by BTS in collaboration with The Chainsmokers from Love Yourself: Her, 2017
"The Best of Me", a song by Michael Learns to Rock from Still, 2018
"Best of Me", a song by NEFFEX, 2019
"Best of Me", a song by Swedish singer Efraim Leo during Melodifestivalen 2021
"Best of Me" (Josh Ramsay song), 2022

Other uses
The Best of Me (novel), a 2011 novel by Nicholas Sparks
The Best of Me (film), a 2014 film adaptation of the Sparks novel
The Best of Me (TV special), a 2008 concert television special by Regine Velasquez